Sydney Olympic Park ferry wharf is located on the southern side of the Parramatta River serving the Sydney suburb of Wentworth Point.

History
Sydney Olympic Park wharf opened on 22 September 1997 to service the Sydney Olympic Park precinct for the 2000 Summer Olympics. Today it also serves the Sydney suburb of Wentworth Point. It is served by Sydney Ferries Parramatta River services operating between Circular Quay and Parramatta. The single wharf is served by First Fleet and RiverCat class ferries.

On 14 January 2015, the wharf closed for a rebuild with services using the nearby Armory wharf. The wharf reopened on 20 May 2015.

Wharves & services

Interchanges
Transit Systems operates one route to and from Sydney Olympic Park wharf:
526: between Rhodes and Burwood station

References

External links

Sydney Olympic Park Wharf at Transport for New South Wales (Archived 13 June 2019)
Sydney Olympic Wharf Local Area Map Transport for NSW

Ferry wharves in Sydney
Sydney Olympic Park